Cannock Wood is a village and civil parish in the Cannock Chase district of Staffordshire, England. According to the 2011 Census, the parish had a population of 1,031, a decrease from 1,052 in the 2001 Census.

Cannock Wood makes up part of Cannock Chase which is a recognised Area of Outstanding Natural Beauty.

Its mainly residential area is interspersed with open areas including various parks and public footpaths through the local countryside. The village hosts tourist attractions including Castle Ring, an ancient fort, and Nun's Well.

Cannock Wood also hosts a general store, Dickinson's, and two pubs, The Park Gate Inn and The Redmore. There is also a village hall, a children's play area, a cricket club and a hairdressers.

Most children living in Cannock Wood between the ages of 4 and 11 attend the primary school in the neighbouring hamlet of Gentleshaw.

Twin towns 
Cannock Wood and the surrounding district are twinned with

  Datteln, Germany

See also 
 Radmore Abbey

References

External links

 Cannock Wood and Gentleshaw Village Hall Website
 Cannock Wood Parish Council
 Cannock Wood Cricket Club Official website

Villages in Staffordshire
Cannock Chase
Civil parishes in Staffordshire
Cannock Chase District